The Tudanca is a traditional Spanish breed of cattle from Cantabria, in northern Spain. In the past it was a draught breed, much used for transport of goods to and from the ports of the Cantabrian coast; it is now reared for meat, but is still used in traditional sport of arrastre de piedra, or "stone-dragging". Despite its geographic proximity, it is not closely related to the other cattle breed of Cantabria, the Pasiega.

Appearance and description 

Tudanca is a middle-sized cattle breed, with cows reaching 135 cm shoulder height and a weight of 320 kg, bulls reaching 150 cm and 420 kg. The colour of Tudanca goes from greyish to black, cows are lighter than bulls on average. Like the aurochs, Tudanca bulls have a light stripe on their back. Additionally, they often have a light saddle. Typically for Tudanca is the swung back line, which is strongly pronounced in bulls. The cows are smaller and more gracile than the bulls. The long horns of Tudanca are variable, they can be either aurochs-like or swung outwards. Tudanca bulls often carry long curly hair on their front head, which is a feature also described for the aurochs.

José María de Cossío describes the breed as "agile, strong, frugal and hardy". Tudancas are adapted to the mountainous orography and climate of the Cantabrian upland. Indeed, herds are moved up to the high pastures to graze on June where they are left until October.

Range and use 

Tudancas were formerly used in inner Cantabria as work animals in the field, but after the mechanization of agriculture, the breed was listed as protected domestic animal, since it is, like other primitive cattle breeds, facing extinction because its low economical production rate. The efforts of many breeders and the lately recognized quality of its superb meat have stopped declining and livestock grows back. An equation from 2008 counted 12.991 individuals.  

Tudancas are used by the Arbeitsgemeinschaft Biologischer Umweltschutz in Soest, Germany, in a semi-feral state in grazing projects to retain an open landscape with its biodiversity. Furthermore, Tudancas are used in the Netherlands for the same purpose, e.g. in Johannahoeve and the Planken Wambuis reserve. Stichting Taurus also uses this breed. There, it is integrated in TaurOs Project, which aims to breed a type of cattle that resembles the aurochs by crossing with other aurochs-like breeds like Sayaguesa Cattle, Pajuna Cattle, Maremmana primitivo and others.

Gallery

See also 

 Aurochs
 TaurOs Project

References

External links
 http://www.infocarne.com/bovino/raza_tudanca.htm
 http://www.stichtingtaurus.nl/
 http://www.feagas.com/index.php/es/razas/bovino/tudanca

Cattle breeds originating in Spain
Animal breeds originating in Cantabria
Cattle breeds